George Caldwell may refer to:

 George Caldwell (cricketer) (1807–1863), English cricketer
 George Caldwell (Louisiana official) (1892–1966), Louisiana contractor
 George Caldwell (politician) (1814–1866), U.S. Representative from Kentucky
 George Chapman Caldwell (1834–1907), American chemist, horticulturalist and instructor
 George F. Caldwell (1840–1933), Wisconsin State Assemblyman

See also
 
 George Cadwell (1773–1826), American politician